The Western News is a twice-weekly newspaper in Libby, Montana. Its coverage area is southern Lincoln County, which includes the communities of Libby and Troy. The Western News was founded in 1902, and is owned by Duane Hagadone and the Hagadone Newspaper Group. The newspaper carries publication dates of Wednesday and Friday, though copies are available as early as Tuesday and Thursday afternoons in local newsstands. Its online edition was introduced in the spring of 1995.

External links 
 

Newspapers published in Montana
Publications established in 1902
1902 establishments in Montana